Tony Cosentino (born August 25, 1988) is an American professional stock car racing driver. He competes full-time in the ARCA Menards Series, driving the No. 45 Chevrolet for Tamayo Cosentino Racing.

Racing career

K&N Pro Series West 
Cosentino made his NASCAR K&N Pro Series West (now the ARCA Menards Series West) debut in 2019, running three races at Evergreen Speedway, Meridian Speedway, and Phoenix Raceway. His best finish was 15th at Evergreen. He failed to finish any races.

ARCA Menards Series East 
Cosentino ran 2 races in the ARCA Menards Series East in 2021, running at Iowa Speedway and the Milwaukee Mile. He failed to finish both races.

ARCA Menards Series 
Cosentino ran 10 races in his debut season in the ARCA Menards Series in 2021. Cosentino DNF'ed in all but one race. In that race, at Winchester Speedway, Cosentino finished 10th, his first career top ten finish.

Motorsports career results

ARCA Menards Series

ARCA Menards Series East

ARCA Menards Series West

References

External links 

1988 births
Living people
ARCA Menards Series drivers
NASCAR drivers
Racing drivers from Ohio
Sportspeople from Mansfield, Ohio